El Djazaïr (in Arabic الجزائر meaning Algeria in Arabic) is an Arabic-language newspaper in Algeria. In April 2008 the paper launched Algérie-Edition, its Francophone edition.

References

Newspapers published in Algeria
Arabic-language newspapers
French-language newspapers published in Algeria